George William Humphreys (15 March 1870 – 11 May 1933) was an English-born New Zealand rugby union player who represented the All Blacks in 1894. His position of choice was loose forward. Humphreys did not play in any test matches as New Zealand did not play their first until 1903.

Humphreys was born in Wolverhampton, England and moved to New Zealand at the age of 17.

He died in Rotorua in 1933.

Career 
Humphreys played nine games for the province between 1891 and 1894.

He played in Canterbury's match against the touring NSW side.

Based on his performances he was then selected for the national team in their match against the tourists which was conveniently played in Christchurch. Humphreys scored a try, however the match was lost 8-6.

He may have played again in 1897 but this is far from certain.

Farming 
Humphreys purchased Willencote, a farm located in Gisborne in 1918. His acquisition contained 1,827 acres of land. In 1923 the ownership was then handed to his son, Frank. The farm is currently owned and operated by the 4th generation of the Humphreys family. The farm size is now smaller, being 1,040 acres.

Family 
His son, Frank "Fred" Edwin Humphreys represented between 1919 and 1920.

References 

1870 births
1933 deaths
New Zealand international rugby union players
New Zealand rugby union players
Rugby union players from Wolverhampton